Joel Hoekstra (born December 13, 1970) is an American guitarist currently in the band Whitesnake. Hoekstra also tours as a guitarist for Trans-Siberian Orchestra. The son of classical musicians, he started out playing cello and piano at a young age, but it was hearing Angus Young of AC/DC that inspired him to start playing the guitar. He was raised in the suburbs of Chicago, in Orland Park, but has lived in New York City since 2001.

Hoekstra has performed with Trans-Siberian Orchestra and was the lead guitarist in the Broadway musical, Rock of Ages. He also made a cameo appearance alongside Sebastian Bach, Nuno Bettencourt, Kevin Cronin and Debbie Gibson in the big screen movie adaptation of Rock of Ages.

Career

Night Ranger
In 2008, Hoekstra joined Night Ranger and combined with guitarist Brad Gillis as a part of the group’s dual guitar driven sound. Hoekstra toured with Night Ranger and performed on several albums with the group and appeared in the videos for the songs Growin' Up In California, Knock Knock Never Stop and High Road. In 2011, Joel filled in for Mick Jones in Foreigner while continuing to play with Night Ranger on the same tour.

Whitesnake
In 2014, Hoekstra joined Whitesnake as their guitarist alongside fellow guitarist Reb Beach. Hoekstra played on The Purple Album (released May 2015) which was a re-imagination of classic songs from David Coverdale's time as the lead singer for Deep Purple. Hoekstra appeared in the videos for the songs "Stormbringer", "Gypsy" and "Soldier of Fortune" off The Purple Album and "Shut Up & Kiss Me" and "Trouble is Your Middle Name" videos off the Flesh and Blood album. Hoekstra was co-writer with Coverdale on six of the songs on Flesh and Blood. He has toured with Whitesnake on their The Purple Album tour (2015–16), The Greatest Hits tour (2016-2018) and their Flesh and Blood tour (2019).

Cher

Hoekstra played guitar for Cher on the Here We Go Again Tour of 2018-2020. He also served as guitarist for Cher during her Las Vegas residency at the Monte Carlo. Hoekstra performed at the 2017 Billboard Music Awards as the guitarist for Cher on the songs "Believe" and "If I Could Turn Back Time" as Cher received the Icon Award.

Side projects and guest appearances
In 2015, Frontiers Records released the debut album Dying to Live from his side project Joel Hoekstra's 13, to rave reviews. The album featured performances by Russell Allen, Vinny Appice, Tony Franklin, and Jeff Scott Soto.
In 2016, Hoekstra played on Michael Sweet’s chart-topping<ref>{{Cite web |url=http://www.newreleasetoday.com/news_detail.php?newsid= |title="/>  album One Sided War and appeared in the video for the song "Radio".

Hoekstra served as a counselor at the 20th anniversary of the Rock 'n Roll Fantasy Camp where he played along with Nancy Wilson, Vinnie Appice, Steven Adler, and Gregg Bissonette and others. Hoekstra also frequently plays acoustic duo shows with singer/guitarist Brandon Gibbs (Devil City Angels). Hoekstra also performed with Paul Shortino on the song "War Cry" on the album Sinister (released on October 27, 2017) by Appice (Carmine Appice and Vinny Appice).

Hoekstra appeared as guest guitarist on two episodes of  That Metal Show on VH1 Classic (January 25, 2014, and March 14, 2015). and has performed on stage and in the studio with many artists including Foreigner, Dee Snider, Jeff Scott Soto, Jim Peterik, The Turtles, Big Brother & the Holding Company, and many more.

Hoekstra has contributed to many articles in Guitar World magazine and in 2017 Guitar World released an instructional DVD titled Hard Rock Lead Guitar Master Class with Joel Hoekstra.

Discography

Solo albums
 Undefined (2000)
 The Moon Is Falling (2003) 
 13 Acoustic Songs (2007)

Joel Hoekstra's 13
 Dying to Live (2015)
 Running Games (2021)

Contributing albums
 Rock of Ages - Original Broadway Cast Recording (2009)
 Night Ranger - Somewhere in California (2011)
 Night Ranger - 24 Strings & a Drummer (Live & Acoustic) (2012)
 Night Ranger - High Road (2014)
 Jack Blades - Rock 'n Roll Ride (2012)
 Jeff Scott Soto - Damage Control (2012)
 Trans-Siberian Orchestra - Dream of Fireflies (On a Christmas Night) (2012)
 Amy Lee - Aftermath (2014)
VHF - Very High Frequency (2014)
 Whitesnake - The Purple Album (2015)
 Michael Sweet - One Sided War (2016)
 Tony Mills - Streets of Chance (2017)
 Whitesnake - The Purple Tour (2017)
 Whitesnake - Flesh and Blood (2019)
 Chris Catena's Rock City Tribe - Truth in Unity (2020)
 Iconic - Second Skin (2022)
 Docker's Guild - The Mystic Technocracy - Season 2: The Age of Entropy'' (2022)

References

External links
 

Living people
American rock guitarists
Night Ranger members
Whitesnake members
American male guitarists
1970 births
People from Orland Park, Illinois